The women's 800 metres event at the 2022 African Championships in Athletics was held on 11 and 12 August in Port Louis, Mauritius.

Medalists

Results

Heats
Qualification: First 3 of each heat (Q) and the next 2 fastest (q) qualified for the final.

Final

References

2022 African Championships in Athletics
800 metres at the African Championships in Athletics